Edward Brian Cashman (born 1965) is a retired American naval officer who served as Commander, Standing NATO Maritime Group ONE in 2019.

He graduated from the Massachusetts Institute of Technology (MIT) in 1987 with a Bachelor of Science in Mechanical Engineering. He was commissioned through Navy Officer Candidate School in 1988 and holds a Master of Science in Nuclear Engineering from the University of Maryland and a Master of Arts in National Security Studies from the Naval War College in Newport, Rhode Island.

In April 2017 he was the prison camp commander for Guantanamo Bay Navy Base, appointed by President Trump. He took command of NATO's Standing NATO Maritime Group (SNMG) ONE on January 14, 2019, and then Royal Norwegian Navy Commodore Yngve Skoglund took over his command of the NATO group on December 9, 2019.

References

External links

Official Navy Biography

1965 births
Living people
Place of birth missing (living people)
MIT School of Engineering alumni
University System of Maryland alumni
Naval War College alumni
Recipients of the Legion of Merit
United States Navy rear admirals
Recipients of the Defense Superior Service Medal